Michael Festing is a British research scientist best known for his interest in animal testing.

He is one of 19 members of the UK's Animal Procedures Committee, which advises the Home Secretary on matters related to animal testing. He was previously a trustee of the Fund for the Replacement of Animals in Medical Experiments (FRAME ), which funds and promotes research into the use of animal alternatives. He is also a council member of the Institute of Laboratory Animals Research USA. 

Most of Michael Festing's career has been involved in promoting reduction of the numbers of animals used in research. Nonetheless, Festing has been criticized by the animal rights movement for his investment in companies that engage in animal testing, which according to the Animal Procedures Committee register of members' interests,  includes AstraZeneca, GlaxoSmithKline, Alizyme, Akambis, Cambridge Antibody, Shire Pharmaceuticals, and Celltech. 

He is also a consultant geneticist to Harlan UK, which supplies animals to laboratories.

Life and education
Festing is a chartered statistician, has a Ph.D in quantitative genetics from Iowa State University, and a D.Sc. from the University of London.

He is the father of Simon Festing, the former executive director of the Research Defence Society, which focuses on supplying information about, and defending, the use of animals in medical experiments in the UK.

Research
Festing is the author of over 200 scientific papers on laboratory animal genetics and related issues. He has a particular interest in improving the design of animal experiments, particularly in the area of toxicology testing. He has written books cataloguing laboratory animals, including International Index of Laboratory Animals and Inbred Strains in Biomedical Research.

Award
He was the winner in 1996 of the GlaxoSmithKline Laboratory Animal Welfare Prize for his work while at the University of Leicester on "improved experimental design leading to reductions in the use of laboratory animals."

References
Brief biography of Michael Festing, PharmaDiscovery, retrieved February 22, 2006
Corporate members of FRAME, Fund for the Replacement of Animals in Medical Experiments, retrieved February 22, 2006
Current APC Members and Register of Interests, Animal Procedures Committee, retrieved February 22, 2006
"RDS, Michael Festing, and Simon Festing: Who's Who", Americans for Medical Advancement, retrieved February 22, 2006
"GlaxoSmithKline laboratory animal welfare prize", Research Defence Society

Alumni of the University of London
Academics of the University of Leicester
Living people
Year of birth missing (living people)
Iowa State University alumni
Animal testing in the United Kingdom